Sobraon Barracks is a military installation in Lincoln, England. It is currently occupied by the 160 (Lincoln) Squadron Royal Logistic Corps and Lincolnshire Army Cadet Force.

History
The "new barracks" were built in the Fortress Gothic Revival Style to the north of the "old barracks" on Burton Road and were completed in 1880. The new barracks became the depot for the two battalions of the 10th (North Lincolnshire) Regiment of Foot. Their creation took place as part of the Cardwell Reforms which encouraged the localisation of British military forces. Following the Childers Reforms, the regiment evolved to become the Royal Lincolnshire Regiment with its depot in the barracks in 1881.

In 1953 the new barracks were renamed "Sobraon Barracks" by the then commanding officer, Colonel P J E Rowell OBE MC, after the Battle of Sobraon, a confrontation which had taken place during the First Anglo-Sikh War. The Regiment amalgamated with the Northamptonshire Regiment to form the 2nd East Anglian Regiment in 1960. Large parts of Sobraon Barracks were demolished in the 1970s although the keep still remains and is still used as an Army Reserve Centre by Lincolnshire Army Cadet Force. In March 2014 it was announced that 
160 (Lincoln) Squadron Royal Logistic Corps would be based at Sobraon Barracks.

References

Barracks in England
Installations of the British Army
Buildings and structures in Lincoln, England